Wicked Little Letters is an upcoming comedy film directed by Thea Sharrock.

Premise
The residents of Littlehampton begin to receive obscene letters from an unknown source, prompting a group of women to find the source.

Cast
 Olivia Colman as Edith Swan
 Jessie Buckley as Rose Gooding
 Timothy Spall
 Joanna Scanlan
 Hugh Skinner
 Malachi Kirby
 Gemma Jones
 Lolly Adefope
 Eileen Atkins
 Alisha Weir
 Krishni Patel

Production
The film was announced in May 2022, with Thea Sharrock set to direct, and Olivia Colman and Jessie Buckley starring. In September, the cast was rounded out, with Timothy Spall, Gemma Jones and Eileen Atkins among the additions.

Production began in September 2022, with Ben Davis serving as cinematographer. Production occurred in Arundel and Worthing in early October.

References

External links
Wicked Little Letters at the Internet Movie Database

Upcoming films
British comedy films
Films shot in West Sussex
2023 films
2020s British films
2023 comedy films